The United States Coast Guard Cutters were a senior amateur ice hockey team operated by the United States Coast Guard Yard on Curtis Bay, Baltimore. The team played in the Eastern Amateur Hockey League for parts of two seasons, using Carlin's Iceland for home games. The Cutters were a separate team from the established Coast Guard Bears of the United States Coast Guard Academy.

History
The team was founded in 1942 by personnel officer Lieutenant Commander C.R. MacLean, of the Coast Guard in Curtis Bay, and replaced the void in the EAHL when the Baltimore Orioles folded. The Cutters were coached by Mel Harwood, a former goaltender for the Orioles, and a former NHL referee known for officiating game four of the 1942 Stanley Cup Finals. Players were required to complete daytime military duties, in addition to playing on the team. The team was accompanied by their own version of the United States Coast Guard Band, that played the “Semper Paratus march," whenever the Cutters scored a goal. 

In the 1942–43 season, Joe Kucler led the league in goals (40), assists (41), and points (81). The Cutters played the defending Stanley Cup champion Detroit Red Wings in an exhibition game on January 6, 1943 in Baltimore, losing 8–3. The Cutters finished first place in the EAHL, winning the Walker Cup. In addition to the EAHL title, the Cutters won two championships of the Amateur Hockey Association of the United States, in 1943 and 1944. Eleven games into the second season, the Cutters withdrew from league play on November 28, 1943, but still played exhibition games. The Cutters team disbanded early in 1944, when the World War II effort needed reinforcements.

Players
The Cutters team featured eight National Hockey League players. 

Three Cutters players were inducted into the Hockey Hall of Fame: Frank Brimsek, Art Coulter, and John Mariucci. 

Five Cutters players were inducted into the United States Hockey Hall of Fame: Frank Brimsek, Bob Dill, John Mariucci, Hub Nelson, and Eddie Olson.

Other notable players

Ossie Asmundson
Eddie Barry
Bud Cook
Alex Motter

Results
Season-by-season results:

References

External links
History of U.S. Coast Guard Academy ice hockey

Defunct ice hockey teams in the United States
Eastern Hockey League teams
Ice hockey teams in Maryland
Ice hockey clubs established in 1942
Military sports clubs in the United States
Sports clubs disestablished in 1943
Sports teams in Baltimore
United States Coast Guard Academy